Selwyn (born Selwyn Pretorius, 1982, in Durban, South Africa) is an R&B singer from Perth, Western Australia. He was a contestant on the Australian reality series Popstars 2, but did not make it through to the final group lineup. He was re-discovered while working at a shopping centre as a trolley boy. Producer Audius Mtawarira overheard him singing and offered to produce him.

Career
In August 2004, Selwyn released "Boomin'". It was written by Paul Rein for Selwyn's second studio album, One Way. Australian singer Israel contributed to the production of the song, which according to Kathy McCabe of The Daily Telegraph is "beefed-up". Selwyn described it as a "different track" with a "different feel". It was promoted through the clothing store Jay Jays, where customers would receive a physical copy of the single after spending $40 at the store. For the week of 19 August 2004, "Boomin'" was the third-most added track to the playlists of Australian radio stations. It entered the Australian Singles Chart at No.28 and spent six weeks within the chart.

Discography

Albums

Singles

References

External links

1982 births
Living people
Musicians from Durban
Musicians from Perth, Western Australia
Australian contemporary R&B singers
South African emigrants to Australia
21st-century Australian singers
21st-century Australian male singers
Australian people convicted of assault